The National Stadium, locally also referred to as Ta' Qali, officially known as Grawnd Nazzjonali (Maltese for National Stadium), is a stadium located in Ta' Qali, Malta. The stadium, which also contains the headquarters of the Malta Football Association, seats 16,997 people and is, by far, the largest stadium in the country. It serves as the national football stadium of Malta and is the home stadium of the Malta national football team. The stadium, together with three other stadiums, also hosts the Maltese Premier League.

History

Background and early years 
Although officially the new stadium was inaugurated on 6 December 1981 with a Maltese Premier League encounter between Zurrieq F.C. and Senglea Athletic F.C., certain records suggest that the stadium was already up and running by May 1981. Indeed, newspapers extracts indicate that the stadium hosted the final of the first ever national championship organised by the now defunct Malta Football Federation (not to be mixed with the Malta Football Association, which at that time was known as the Main Football Association) between Valletta Vanguards FC and Birkirkara St. Joseph Sports Club on 3 May 1981.

The highest ever attendance at the Stadium was on during a 1986 World Cup Qualifier encounter between Malta and West Germany played on 16 December 1984, when 35,102 people turned up to watch Malta narrowly lose to the runners up of the previous World Cup.

The Millennium Stand 

On 3 September, 2002, the Malta Football Association inaugurated the Millennium Stand. The Millennium Stand replaced the 5,000 seater East Stand, which had been declared as a dangerous structure for a number of years by then and hence had to be demolished. The construction of the Millennium Stand, which cost Lm3.5 million, was regarded as the "biggest infrastructural project ever undertaken by the Malta Football Association" whereas the stand itself has been described as "the jewel in the Malta FA's crown".

Pitch Resurfacing 
In 2016, the Maltese Football Association announced a €1.5 million project to replace the old grass surface with a modern hybrid grass surface, with the latter having been in service for 35 years. The project was conducted by SIS Pitches who are renowned for other works such as the Vodafone Arena and iPro Stadium. The expenses were partly financed by UEFA and FIFA, with the rest being covered by the MFA.

Future 

In July 2017, during the annual general meeting, the Malta Football Association announced five projects were announced by the association. Two of these projects, which also include the construction of new futsal hall and a parking adjacent to the Enclosure (West Stand), entail the re-development of the North and South Stands. A short clip shared by the association on its Facebook page suggests that the space behind both the goals will be removed and the two stands will be moved closer to the pitch. The re-development also entails removal of the corners, making stadium an "English-style" venue.

Events

UEFA European Under-17 Championship 

The National Stadium was Malta's main venue during its hosting of the 2014 UEFA European Under-17 Championship. The stadium hosted 7 matches in all, including the opening ceremony, 3 group stage games, the semi-finals and the final. 9,422 people turned up to watch England win the championship by beating the Netherlands on penalties.

Games of the Small States of Europe 

The Xth edition of the Games of the Small States of Europe was held in Malta and the National Stadium was chosen to hold the Opening Ceremony. The Opening Ceremony was spectacular as colour, dance and fireworks made the evening a memorable one for those present at the stadium.

See also
List of football stadiums in Malta

References

External links

 National Stadium at mfa.com.mt
 Ta’ Qali National Stadium at StadiumDB.com

Sports venues in Malta
Football venues in Malta
Athletics (track and field) venues in Malta
Malta
Attard
Sports venues completed in 1981
1981 establishments in Malta
Buildings and structures in Ta' Qali